Events from 2020 in Norfolk Island.

Incumbents 

 Administrator: Eric Hutchinson

Events 
Ongoing – COVID-19 pandemic in Oceania

 3 April – Even though the island had no cases, the government imposed a 32-day travel ban and declared a state of emergency. Administrator Eric Hutchinson stated that the measures were necessary due to the remote island's extremely limited health capacity.
 6 May – Lockdown measures began to be lifted.

Deaths

References 

Years of the 21st century in Norfolk Island
Norfolk Island